Koray İçten (born 24 August 1987) is a Turkish professional footballer who plays as a left back.

References

1987 births
Living people
Turkish footballers
Turkey youth international footballers
İzmirspor footballers
Konyaspor footballers
Bucaspor footballers
Association football defenders